William Craig Fields (February 13, 1804 – October 27, 1882) was a U.S. Representative from New York.

Born in New York City, Fields attended the common schools.
He moved to Laurens, New York, in 1836 and engaged in mercantile pursuits and in 1847 engaged in the manufacture of cotton and linen goods.
He was the Justice of the Peace for sixteen years.
He was clerk of Otsego County from 1852 to 1855, and Supervisor of Otsego County in 1865 and 1866.

Fields was elected as a Republican to the Fortieth Congress (March 4, 1867 – March 3, 1869). After retiring from public life, he died in Laurens, New York on October 27, 1882 and was interred in Laurens Cemetery.

References

1804 births
1882 deaths
Republican Party members of the United States House of Representatives from New York (state)
19th-century American politicians